The Outback Scenic Byway is a designated National Scenic Byway on Oregon state highways that features the scenic rugged landscape of Central Oregon.

Route description
The byway goes between La Pine and just past Lakeview at the California border.  It runs southeast on Oregon Route 31 for most of its length, then continues at the intersection with U.S. Route 395 to the Oregon-California border.

It passes multiple natural attractions including Fort Rock State Park, Hole-in-the-Ground, Summer Lake, and Summer Lake Hot Springs.

The highway is a 2-lane, rural road for its entire length.

Intersections with other highways
 U.S. Route 97 in La Pine
 U.S. Route 395 north of Lakeview

See also

External links
 Outback Scenic Byway from byways.org

Scenic highways in Oregon
National Scenic Byways